Denny Carmassi (born April 30, 1947) is an American drummer most notable for playing with many rock bands.

Biography 
Carmassi was born into a family of drummers; his father, his uncle, and his brother each played the drums. Some of Denny's earliest memories are his father rehearsing after work with his band in the kitchen of their home. Occasionally they allowed young Denny Carmassi to sit in with them. His father exposed him to great drummers, including Buddy Rich, Jimmy Vincent and Richard Goldberg. Then Denny listened the radio and discovered several drummers like Earl Palmer, D.J. Fontana, Al Jackson Jr. (Denny actually learned to play the drums from listening to Al and playing along with the Booker T. & the M.G.'s Green Onions album), Clyde Stubblefield, Jabo Starks, Dino Danelli, Ginger Baker, Mitch Mitchell, John Bonham and Tony Williams.

Out of high school, Denny started playing topless clubs in San Francisco. He joined a band called Sweet Linda Devine, and recorded an album in New York on Columbia, produced by Al Kooper, but before long they parted ways. Denny went on to work with several local bands in the San Francisco Bay Area and began working with Montrose and Sammy Hagar in the 1970s.

Carmassi was a member of the first four line-ups of the band Montrose. After Montrose, he played with his former Montrose bandmate Sammy Hagar as a solo artist, and with his former Montrose bandmates Ronnie Montrose and Jim Alcivar in the band Gamma.

Denny has played with Heart, Coverdale-Page, Whitesnake, and David Coverdale as a solo artist. He also recorded with Randy Meisner, Kim Carnes, Al Stewart, Joe Walsh, 38 Special, Cinderella, Randy Newman and many more. Denny toured with Foreigner in 2002. Currently, he performs with Mercy (featuring Lynda Morrison).

Discography

By date 
1970s
 Sweet Linda Divine – Sweet Linda Divine (1970)
 Montrose – Montrose (1973)
 Montrose – Paper Money (1974)
 Montrose – Warner Brothers Presents... Montrose! (1975)
 Montrose – Jump On It (1976)
 Sammy Hagar – Musical Chairs (1977)
 Sammy Hagar – All Night Long (1978)
 Randy Meisner – Randy Meisner (1978)
 St. Paradise – St. Paradise (1979)

1980s
 Gamma – Gamma 2 (1980)
 Gamma – Gamma 3 (1982)
 Randy Meisner – Randy Meisner (1982)
 Heart – Passionworks (1983)
 Kim Carnes – Café Racers (1983)
 Mitchell Froom – Key of Cool (1984)
 Al Stewart – Russians & Americans (1984)
 Joe Walsh – The Confessor (1985)
 Heart – Heart (1985)
 Stevie Nicks – Rock a Little (1985)
 .38 Special – Strength in Numbers (1986)
 Heart – Bad Animals (1987)
 Whitesnake – Here I Go Again 87 – Radio-Edit Single (1987)
 Cinderella – Long Cold Winter (1988)
 Russell Hitchcock – Russell Hitchcock (1988)
1990s
 Heart – Brigade (1990)
 Heart – Rock the House Live! (1991)
 Coverdale-Page – Coverdale and Page (1993)
 Heart – Desire Walks On (1993)
 Randy Newman – Faust (1995)
 Ted Nugent – Spirit of the Wild (1995)
 Sammy Hagar – Marching to Mars (1997)
 Whitesnake – Restless Heart (1997)
2000s
 David Coverdale – Into the light (2000)
 Trip to Heaven – 707 (2000)
 Gamma – Gamma 4 (2000)
 Bruce Turgon – Outside Looking In (2006)
 Mercy (featuring Lynda Morrison) – "Bad Habit" (2014)

By Band / Artist-surname 
 Kim Carnes – Café Racers (1983)
 Cinderella – Long Cold Winter (1988)
 Coverdale-Page – Coverdale/Page (1993)
 David Coverdale – Into the light (2000)
 Mitchell Froom – Key of Cool (1984)
 Gamma – Gamma 2 (1980)
   Gamma – Gamma 3 (1982)
   Gamma – Gamma 4 (2000)
 Sammy Hagar – Musical Chairs (1977)
   Sammy Hagar – All Night Long (1978)
   Sammy Hagar – Marching to Mars (1997)
 Heart – Passionworks (1983)
   Heart – Heart (1985)
   Heart – Bad Animals (1987)
   Heart – Brigade (1990)
   Heart – Rock the House Live! (1991)
   Heart – Desire Walks On (1993)
 Russell Hitchcock – Russell Hitchcock (1988)
 Randy Meisner – Randy Meisner (1978)
   Randy Meisner – Randy Meisner (1982)
 Montrose – Montrose (1973)
   Montrose – Paper Money (1974)
   Montrose – Warner Brothers Presents... Montrose! (1975)
   Montrose – Jump On It (1976)
   Mercy (featuring Lynda Morrison) – Bad Habit (2014)
 Stevie Nicks – Rock a Little (1985)
   Randy Newman – Faust (1995)
 Ted Nugent – Spirit of the Wild (1995)
   St. Paradise – St. Paradise (1979)
 Al Stewart – Russians & Americans (1984)
 Sweet Linda Divine – Sweet Linda Divine (1970)
   Trip to Heaven – 707 (2000)
 Bruce Turgon – Outside Looking In (2006)
 Joe Walsh – The Confessor (1985)
 Whitesnake – Here I Go Again 87 – Radio-Edit Single (1987)
   Whitesnake – Restless Heart (1997)
 .38 Special – Strength in Numbers (1986)

References

External links 
Interview
Article

American rock drummers
Whitesnake members
Montrose (band) members
Heart (band) members
Living people
Drummers from San Francisco
Sammy Hagar & the Waboritas members
Michael Schenker Group members
Gamma (band) members
1947 births